Archives nationales may refer to:

 Centre Nationale des Archives (Algeria)
 National Archives of Benin
 National Archives of Cameroon
 Archives Nationales du Congo
 Archives Nationales (France)
 Musée des Archives Nationales
 National Archives of Haiti
 Centre des Archives Nationales (Lebanon)
 Direction Nationale des Archives du Mali
 National Archives of Mauritania
 Archives nationales d'outre-mer
 Bibliothèque et Archives nationales du Québec
 National Archives of Senegal
 National Archives of Tunisia